The 2012–13 Swiss Challenge League was the tenth season of the Swiss Challenge League, the second tier of the Swiss football league pyramid. It began on 14 July 2012 and ended on 2 June 2013.

Teams
2011–12 Challenge League champions St. Gallen were promoted to the 2012–13 Super League. They weren't replaced by another team due to Neuchâtel Xamax being demoted to the 4th tier of Swiss football for financial irregularities. 2011–12 Challenge League runners-up Aarau had to compete in a promotion/relegation playoff against 9th-placed Super League team Sion and remained in the Challenge League after losing 3–1 on aggregate.

The bottom five teams – Stade Nyonnais, Étoile Carouge, Delémont, Kriens and Brühl – were relegated to the newly formed 1. Liga Promotion with no teams replaced them due to the Challenge League reducing from 16 to 10 teams.

League table

Results
Teams played each other four times (twice home and twice away) over the course of the season, home and away, for a total of 36 matches per team.

First and Second Round

Third and Fourth Round

Season statistics

Top scorers

Assists

Hat-tricks

Scoring
First goal of the season: Gezim Shalaj for Lugano against Wil (14 July 2012)
Fastest goal of the season: Mirko Facchinetti for Chiasso against Bellinzona (27 August 2012)
Largest winning margin: 8 goals
Bellinzona 8–0 Wil (18 April 2013)
Highest scoring game: 8 goals
Vaduz 5–3 Aarau (6 August 2012)
Aarau 5–3 Wohlen (28 October 2012)
Bellinzona 8–0 Wil (18 April 2013)
Locarno 2–6 Bellinzona (8 May 2013)
Most goals scored by a single team: 8 goals
Bellinzona 8–0 Wil (18 April 2013)
Most goals scored by a losing team: 3 goals
Vaduz 5–3 Aarau (6 August 2012)
Aarau 5–3 Wohlen (28 October 2012)
Lugano 4–3 Bellinzona (2 June 2013)

Clean sheets
Most clean sheets: 15
Bellinzona
Fewest clean sheets: 4
Locarno

Discipline
Most yellow cards (club): 86
Chiasso
Most yellow cards (player): 14
Pietro Di Nardo (Biel-Bienne)
Most red cards (club): 10
Chiasso
Most red cards (player): 2
Marko Bašić (Lugano)
Igor Djuric (Chiasso)
Cha Jong-Hyok (Wil)
Charles-André Doudin (Biel-Bienne)
Emiliano Dudar (Chiasso)
Pavel Pergl (Bellinzona)
Mirko Quaresima (Chiasso)

References

External links
 
Soccerway

Swiss Challenge League seasons
2012–13 in Swiss football
Swiss

de:Schweizer Fussballmeisterschaft 2012/13#Challenge League